Božidar Radošević (born 4 April 1989 in Split) better known by the nickname Rado, is a Croatian professional football goalkeeper who plays for Prva HNL club Gorica.

Personal life
He is the first of two sons of Ivica Radošević, who was also a goalkeeper and subsequently became a schoolteacher. His mother Zdravka is a lawyer. His younger brother, Dino, graduated from the Faculty of Pharmacy in Sarajevo.

In December 2015, Radošević married his long-time girlfriend, Mirela Buljubašić. In November 2017, they had their first child together, a son named Luciano.

Radošević is fluent in Croatian, English and Persian, and can also communicate on Hungarian.

He is the owner of the goalkeeper gloves brand Panthers goalkeeper gloves together with his fellow goalkeeper Matko Obradović.

Career
A product of Hajduk Split academy, Radošević had several loan spells between 2007 and 2010 at lower level Croatian sides and at Željezničar in Bosnia and Herzegovina, before having his league debut for Hajduk in the 2010–11 season on 24 July 2010 against Istra 1961.

In the 2010–2011 season Radošević played in Europa League for Hajduk Split. Radošević debuted in qualifying match against Unirea and also performed in the group stage of competition in matches against AEK and Anderlecht.

Radošević was also capped for Croatia at youth levels, appearing in 15 matches for under-17 and under-19 national teams in 2005 and 2006.

In the 2012 Radošević was the most responsible player for the remaining Solin among Croatian Second League, which brought him a transfer to Istra 1961.

In Istra 1961 Radošević be kept only 8 months and in March 2013 terminated the contract because of debts and disagreements with coach Igor Pamić.

In March 2013 temporarily joins the team Šibenik, where he appeared in 11 games and in June 2013 becomes a free agent.

In July 2013 he signed a contract with Inter Zaprešić.

After a great season in Inter Zaprešić, Radošević goes to Slovenia in Koper.

Radošević is most remembered for his match against Neftchi Baku, which is the best result for Koper in Europa League.

During the season the club was facing the result crisis after the best players left the club. This prompted president Ante Guberac to look for culprits in the players he personally led. From the first team are removing all foreign players led by Radošević. Players were faced with extremely inhumane working conditions and threats by the president Ante Guberac. After a month of work in inhumane conditions, some players have to agree with the club. Radošević has left the club in November 2014 and became a free agent.

In January 2015 Radošević signed half year contract with Hungarian second division club Balmazújváros with the mission of saving the club from relegation.
Radošević and another five Croatian players have made a big miracle and they ensure the second division status for Balmazújváros.

His great form in Hungary have not gone unnoticed by other clubs and in June 2015 signed two years contract with one of the biggest clubs in Hungary Debreceni VSC. He made his debut against Puskás Akadémia in a draw 1-1.
In Debreceni VSC Radosevic was a three times in a row named for the Player of the Month by the fans. He defended a complete season and helped the team to secure third place in the league.

After qualifying matches in Europa League and the failure of Debreceni VSC, he accepted the offer from Iranian club Persepolis and signed contract for two years. In his new club, he made his debut against Sanat Naft in front of 80,000 Persepolis fans. Persepolis won the game and Radosevic provided a clean sheet during the 90 minutes. Radošević enjoys great popularity in Iran and Tehran. He is with his loyalty, work and behavior deserved a special place in hearts of all Persepolis fans forever.

Persepolis became the champion after 9 years with impressive statistics in Persian Gulf Pro League and also very successfully performed in the AFC Champions League 2017 where they have reached the semifinal.

Great success was achieved with Croatian expert coach on the bench Branko Ivanković.

His second season didn't perform that much, only 3 games but Radošević won Super Cup and again Persian Gulf Pro League. The team also reached the finals of the AFC Champions League 2018 which they lost against Kashima Antlers.
On 19 April 2018, he signed a three years contract extension with the Tehran-based club.

Radošević third season in Persepolis was also successful. The team won three competitions Persian Gulf Pro League, Hazfi Cup and Super Cup. Radošević performed well in some matches but still was second choice in Persepolis. The first goalkeeper was Alireza Beiranvand. At the end of the season Croatian coach Branko Ivanković left the team and signed contract with Saudi Professional League team Al-Ahli.

After Ivanković era Argentine coach Gabriel Calderon becomes the new coach of Persepolis.
After three years of waiting, Radošević gets a chance as the first goalkeeper in front of Beiranvand which was an unexpected move by Calderon. First half season Rado performed perfectly without conceding a goal. He was selected for the half season best eleven in the Persian Gulf Pro League. Calderon left the bench in December 2019.

In February 2020 he signs a new four-year contract making him the longest-serving foreigner in Persepolis history.

Career statistics

Club

Honours

Club
Željezničar
Bosnian Premier League (1): 2009–10

Budućnost
Montenegrin First League (1): 2011–12

Persepolis
Persian Gulf Pro League (5): 2016–17, 2017–18, 2018–19, 2019–20, 2020–21
iran Hazfi Cup  (1): 2018–19
Iranian Super Cup (4): 2017, 2018, 2019, 2020
AFC Champions League runner-up (2): 2018, 2020

References

External links
 

PrvaLiga profile 
Božidar Radošević on Instagram

1989 births
Living people
Footballers from Split, Croatia
Association football goalkeepers
Croatian footballers
Croatia youth international footballers
HNK Hajduk Split players
NK Hrvace players
NK Mosor players
NK Imotski players
FK Željezničar Sarajevo players
FK Budućnost Podgorica players
NK Solin players
NK Istra 1961 players
HNK Šibenik players
NK Inter Zaprešić players
FC Koper players
Balmazújvárosi FC players
Debreceni VSC players
Persepolis F.C. players
NK Varaždin (2012) players
Croatian Football League players
Premier League of Bosnia and Herzegovina players
Montenegrin First League players
First Football League (Croatia) players
Slovenian PrvaLiga players
Nemzeti Bajnokság II players
Nemzeti Bajnokság I players
Persian Gulf Pro League players
Croatian expatriate footballers
Expatriate footballers in Bosnia and Herzegovina
Croatian expatriate sportspeople in Bosnia and Herzegovina
Expatriate footballers in Montenegro
Croatian expatriate sportspeople in Montenegro
Expatriate footballers in Slovenia
Croatian expatriate sportspeople in Slovenia
Expatriate footballers in Hungary
Croatian expatriate sportspeople in Hungary
Expatriate footballers in Iran
Croatian expatriate sportspeople in Iran